Dinar Ramilevich Khafizullin (born 5 January 1989) is a Russian professional ice hockey defenceman. He currently plays for Ak Bars Kazan of the Kontinental Hockey League (KHL).

Playing career
Khafizullin made his Kontinental Hockey League debut playing with Ak Bars Kazan during the 2010–11 KHL season. During his fourth season with HC Vityaz in 2013–14, Khafizullin was traded at the deadline to contending club, SKA Saint Petersburg in exchange for Georgy Berdyukov on 16 January 2014.

Following eight seasons with SKA Saint Petersburg, and following pre-season leading into the 2021–22 season, Khafizullin was traded to Salavat Yulaev Ufa in exchange for Mikhail Vorobyev on 28 August 2021.

On 4 May 2022, Khafizullin signed a two-year contract as a free agent to return to his original KHL club, Ak Bars Kazan.

Career statistics

Regular season and playoffs

International

Awards and honors

References

External links

1989 births
Living people
Volga Tatar people
Ak Bars Kazan players
People from Magnitogorsk
Russian ice hockey defencemen
Salavat Yulaev Ufa players
SKA Saint Petersburg players
Tatar people of Russia
Tatar sportspeople
HC Vityaz players
Sportspeople from Chelyabinsk Oblast